Boalemo is a regency of Gorontalo Province, Indonesia. It is located on the northern peninsula of the island of Sulawesi. It was established in 1999 under Law Number (Undang-Undang Nomor) 50/1999. It has an area of 1,831.33 km2, and had a population of 129,253 at the 2010 Census and 145,868 at the 2020 census; the official estimate as at mid 2021 was 147,038.  The seat of the regency administration is the town of Tilamuta.

Administrative Districts 
Boalemo Regency is now divided into seven districts  (kecamatan), tabulated below with their areas and their populations at the 2010 Census  and 2020 Census, together with the official estimates as at mid 2021. The table also includes the locations of the district administrative centres, the number of administrative villages (rural desa and urban kelurahan) in each district, and its postal codes.

Notes: (a) including 7 offshore islands. (b) including 10 offshore islands. (c) including 2 offshore islands. (d) including 2 offshore islands.

References

External links 
 
  

Regencies of Gorontalo